Gaia-Onbashira is an album by the new age artist Kitarō. It was nominated for the Grammy Award for Best New Age Album in 1998.

Track listing

Charts

References

External links
Kitaro official web site 
Kitaro official web site  
Kitaro TV - Kitaro's official YouTube page
Kitaro Facebook

Kitarō albums
1998 albums